The Midland Formation is a Mesozoic (latest Triassic to earliest Jurassic) geological formation in the Culpeper Basin of Virginia. It is a sedimentary unit which formed in a short period of time between the first two basalt flows in the basin: the Hickory Grove and Mount Zion Church basalts. The most common rocks in the formation are dark reddish interbedded sandstones and siltstones, representative of fluvial (stream) environments. Rare but fossiliferous calcareous shale and limestone also occurs, representing recurring lacustrine (lake) conditions. The Midland Formation is considered equivalent to the Shuttle Meadow Formation of the Hartford Basin, the Feltville Formation of the Newark Basin, and the Bendersville Formation of the Gettysburg Basin.

Based on conchostracan biostratigraphy, the Midland Formation is believed to contain the Triassic-Jurassic boundary near its base. A prominent shale layer containing Hettangian-age fossilized fish, the Midland fish bed, is present about 10 meters above the base of the formation. Though now flooded by a manmade lake, it was formerly well-exposed along Licking Run, just north of Midland, Virginia. Plant spores and fossil theropod tracks have also been reported from the site.

See also

 List of dinosaur-bearing rock formations
 List of stratigraphic units with theropod tracks

Footnotes

References
 Weishampel, David B.; Dodson, Peter; and Osmólska, Halszka (eds.): The Dinosauria, 2nd, Berkeley: University of California Press. 861 pp. .

Geologic formations of Maryland
Geologic formations of Virginia
Triassic System of North America
Triassic geology of Virginia
Rhaetian Stage
Sandstone formations
Conglomerate formations
Shale formations
Siltstone formations
Alluvial deposits
Ichnofossiliferous formations
Paleontology in Virginia